Mera may refer to:

Places 

Mera, Pastaza, a town in Ecuador
Shell Mera, Pastaza, a town in Ecuador
Mera people, a community in Tulunadu, India
Mera, Dhanbad, a town in India
Méra, a village in Borsod-Abaúj-Zemplén County, Hungary
, a village in Baciu Commune, Cluj County, Romania
Mera, Vrancea, a commune in Romania

Geographical features
Mera (Lake Como), a river in Switzerland and Italy (also known as the Maira in Switzerland)
, a tributary of the Žeimena in Lithuania
Mera Peak, a mountain in Nepal
Mera, a tributary of the river Nadăș in Romania
Mera, a tributary of the river Dâlgov in Romania

Other 
Cipriano Mera (1897–1975), Spanish military and political figure during the Second Spanish Republic
Mera (comics), a comic book character, wife of Aquaman
Mera (DC Extended Universe), a character in the DCEU, based on the DC comic book character who is portrayed by actress Amber Heard
MERA 300, a Polish minicomputer family
MER-A (Mars Exploration Rover - A), the Spirit rover
MERA, a type of Pontiac Fiero
Radical Left Front (Metopo Rizospastikis Aristeras), a coalition of far-left political parties in Greece
Multi-scale entanglement renormalization ansatz, proposed by Spanish physicist Guifré Vidal

See also
 
 Mer (disambiguation)
 Meera